Ahmed Alhassan Yakubu (born 3 December 1957) is a fine Agriculturist/Farmer and Ghanaian politician. He is also a member of the Sixth Parliament of the Fourth Republic who represents the Mion Constituency.

Personal life 
Yakubu is a Muslim, and is married with three children.

Early life and education 
Yakubu was born on 3 December 1957. He hails from Sang, a town in the Northern Region of Ghana. He graduated from Imperial College, University of London, and obtained his Doctor of Philosophy degree in Agronomy in 2000.

Politics 
Yakubu is a member of the National Democratic Congress. He was first elected into parliament on the ticket of the National Democratic Congress during the December 2004 Ghanaian General Elections as a member of Parliament for the Mion constituency. He polled 10,568 votes out of the 27,034 valid votes cast representing 39.10%. He won his re-election bid in 2008 with 11,977 votes out of the 27,118 valid votes cast representing 44.17%. He contested again in 2012 and polled 9,931 votes out of the 25,115 valid votes cast representing 39.54%.

Career 
 Council for Scientific and Industrial Research - Savanna Agricultural Research Institute
 Member of Parliament (January 2005 – January 2017)
 Farmer/agriculturist

References 

1957 births
Living people
Alumni of the University of London
Ghanaian MPs 2005–2009
Ghanaian Muslims
National Democratic Congress (Ghana) politicians
Alumni of Imperial College London
Ghana Senior High School (Tamale) alumni
Ghanaian MPs 2009–2013
Ghanaian MPs 2013–2017